Zero1 may refer to:
 ZERO1 (nonprofit), a non-profit organization dedicated to inspiring creativity at the intersection of art, technology and digital culture
 Pro Wrestling Zero1, a Japanese professional wrestling promotion founded in 2001
 Zero 1, a rock band featuring Hal Sparks
 Zero1, a mobile virtual network operator in Singapore; see List of mobile network operators of the Asia Pacific region
Zero1 Agency, an advertising & marketing agency that's headquartered in Los Angeles, California and was founded in 2014